The 29th Flying Training Wing was a wing of the United States Army Air Forces.  It was last assigned to the Western Flying Training Command, and was disbanded on 16 June 1946 at Napier Field, Alabama. The wing controlled World War II Phase One primary flying training units of the Army Air Forces Training Command.  Headquartered at Moody Field, Georgia for most of its operational service, it controlled contract civilian-operated pilot schools primarily in the Southeastern United States.

There is no lineage connection between the 29th Flying Training Wing, established on 22 December 1939 as the 29th Bombardment Group (Heavy) at Langley Field, Virginia, and this organization.

History
Until 1939, the United States Army Air Corps provided all flying training with military instructor pilots.  Beginning in 1939, it contracted with nine civilian flying schools to provide primary flight training.   Primary training consisted of a three-month course of 65 hours of flying instruction.   As the United States prepared to enter World War II by expanding its number of flying squadrons, the number of contract primary schools increased.

According to the contract, the government supplied students with training aircraft, flying clothes, textbooks, and equipment. The Air Corps also put a detachment at each school to supervise training. The schools furnished instructors, training sites and facilities, aircraft maintenance, quarters, and mess halls. From the Air Corps, schools received a flat fee of $1,170 for each graduate and $18 per flying hour for students eliminated from training.

Following the fall of France in 1940, the Air Corps upped its pilot production goal to 7,000 per year. To meet that goal, the Air Corps increased the capacity of its schools and added more contract primary schools.

The vast majority of contract primary pilot training ended in the spring of 1944 as part of the rundown of Army pilot training.  The ones remaining open ended their operations in October, 1945.

Lineage
 Established as 29th Flying Training Wing on 17 December 1942
 Activated on 26 December 1942
 Disbanded on 16 June 1946.

Assignments
 Army Air Forces Southeast Flying Training (later, AAF Eastern Flying) Command, 26 December 1942
 Western Flying Training Command, 15 December 1945 – 16 June 1946

Stations
 Moody Field, Georgia, 26 December 1942
 Napier Field, Alabama, 1 April 1945 – 16 June 1946

Training aircraft

CPS Primary Trainers were primarily PT-17 Stearman biplanes and Fairchild PT-19s monoplanes, although a wide variety of other types could be found at the airfields.   The Fairchild PT-19 aircraft also could have the student pilot covered with a hood for "Blind" instrument flying training.

Glider pilot schools used Aeronca TG-5As, Taylorcraft TG-6As, and Piper TG-8As unpowered glider conversions of powered light observation aircraft which had similar characteristics to the military gliders under development.

Contract Pilot Schools

 Albany Army Airfield, Albany Georgia
 52d  Flying Training Detachment
 Operated by: Darr Aero-Tech Primary Flying School
 Opened: October 1940, Closed: November 1944 (PT-17)
 Controlled four auxiliary airfields

 Augustine Field, Madison, Mississippi
 62d Flying Training Detachment
 Operated by: Mississippi Institute of Aeronautics
 Opened: 1941, Closed: June 1944 (PT-17, PT-19)
 Was a sub-base to Jackson Army Airbase, CFS controlled three auxiliary airfields

 Avon Park Municipal Airport, Avon Park, Florida
 61st Flying Training Detachment
 Operated by: Lodwick Aviation Military Academy
 Opened: October 1941, Closed: June 1944 (PT-17)
 Controlled four auxiliary airfields

 Carlstrom Field, Arcadia, Florida
 53d Flying Training Detachment
 2148th Army Air Forces Base Unit (Contract Pilot School, Primary), April 1944
 Operated by: Embry-Riddle Company
 Opened: June 1941, Closed: June 1945 (PT-17)
 Controlled four auxiliary airfields (Joint with Dorr Field)

 Chester Field, McBride, Missouri
 74th Flying Training Detachment
 Operated by: Anderson Air Activities
 Opened: June 1943, Closed: March 1944 (PT-17)

 Decatur Airport, Decatur, Alabama
 65th Flying Training Detachment
 Operated by: Southern Regional Airways, Inc
 Opened: October 1941, Closed: September 1945 (PT-17, PT-19)
 Controlled five auxiliary airfields

 Douglas Airport, Douglas, Georgia
 63d Flying Training Detachment
 Operated by: South Georgia College
 Opened: May 1941, Closed: December 1944 (PT-17)
 Controlled four auxiliary airfields

 Dorr Field, Arcadia, Florida
 54th Flying Training Detachment
 Operated by: Embry-Riddle Company
 Opened: October 1941, Closed: October 1944 (PT-17, PT-19)
 Controlled four auxiliary airfields (Joint with Carlstrom Field)

 Fletcher Field, Clarksdale, Mississippi
 69th Flying Training Detachment
 Operated by: Clarksdale School of Aviation
 Opened: August 1942, Closed: August 1944 (PT-17, PT-19, PT-23)
 Controlled two auxiliary airfields

 Harrell Field, Camden, Arkansas
 59th Flying Training Detachment
 Operated by: Wiggings-Marden Aero Corp
 Opened: August 1942, Closed: April 1944 (PT-17, PT-19)
 Controlled two auxiliary airfields

 Harris Army Airfield, Cape Giardeau, Missouri
 73d Flying Training Detachment
 Operated by: Cape Institute of Aeronautics, Inc
 Opened: January 1943, Closed: March 1944 (PT-18, PT-19, PT-23)
 Controlled three auxiliary airfields

 Hawthorne School of Aeronautics, Orangeburg, South Carolina
 58th Flying Training Detachment
 2162d Army Air Forces Base Unit (Contract Pilot School, Primary), April 1944
 Operated by: Hawthorne School of Aeronautics
 Opened: October 1941, Closed: November 1945 (PT-18, PT-19, PT-23)
 Also conducted Free French Air Force pilot training
 Controlled three auxiliary airfields

   
 Lodwick Field, Lakeland, Florida
 61st Flying Training Detachment
 2160th Army Air Forces Base Unit (Contract Pilot School, Primary), April 1944
 Operated by: Lodwick School of Aeronautics
 Opened: September 1940, Closed: August 1945 (PT-17)
 Controlled seven auxiliary airfields

 Lafayette Airport, Lafayette, Louisiana
 70th Flying Training Detachment
 Lafayette School of Aeronautics
 Opened: September 1941, Closed: April 1944 (PT-17, PT-19)
 Controlled four auxiliary airfields

 McKellar Field, Jackson, Tennessee
 68th Flying Training Detachment
 Operated by: Georgia Air Services, Incorporated
 Opened: July 1942, Closed: October 1944 (PT-17, PT-19, PT-23, PT-27)

 Moton Field, Tuskegee, Alabama
 66th Flying Training Detachment
 2564th Army Air Forces Base Unit (Contract Pilot School, Primary) (Colored), April 1944
 Operated by: Tuskegee Institute
 Opened: June 1941, Closed: October 1945 (PT-13, PT-14, PT-17)
 Controlled two auxiliary airfields

 Palmer Field, Bennettsville, South Carolina
 53d Flying Training Detachment
 Operated by: Georgia Air Service, Incorporated and Southeastern Air Service, Incorporated
 Opened: October 1941, Closed: October 1944 (PT-17)

 Souther Field, Americus, Georgia
 56th Flying Training Detachment
 Operated by: Graham Aviation Co.
 Opened: February 1941, Closed: October 1944 (PT-17)

 Taylor Field, Ocala, Florida
 57th Flying Training Detachment
 Operated by: Greenville Aviation School
 Opened: December 1941, Closed: September 1944 (PT-17)

 Thompson-Robbins Field, Helena, Arkansas
 59th Flying Training Detachment
 Operated by: Helena Aerotech
 Opened: October 1941, Closed: August 1944 (PT-17, PT-19, PT-23)
 Controlled five auxiliary airfields

 Van de Graaff Field, Tuscaloosa, Alabama
 51st Flying Training Detachment
 Operated by: Alabama Institute of Aeronautics, Inc
 Opened: September 1939, Closed: August 1944 (PT-11, PT-17, PT-19)
 Also conducted Free French Air Force pilot training
 Controlled five auxiliary airfields

 Embry Riddle Aeronautical Institute, Union City, Tennessee
 67th Flying Training Detachment 
 Operated by: Riddle-McKay Company of Tennessee and Riddle Aeronautical Institute
 Opened: August 1943, Closed: April 1944 (PT-17, PT-19, PT-23, PT-27)
 Controlled three auxiliary airfields

 Woodward Field, Camden, South Carolina
 64th Flying Training Detachment
 Operated by: Southern Aviation School
 Opened: April 1941, Closed: August 1944 (PT-17)
 Controlled two auxiliary airfields

Contract Glider Pilot Schools

 Antigo Airport, Antigo, Wisconsin
 14th Glider Training Detachment
 Pre-Glider/Primary Training School (TG-8A)
 Operated by: Anderson Air Activities

 Bates Field, Mobile Alabama
 18th Glider Training Detachment
 Basic Glider Training School (TG-2, TG-4A, TG-5, TG-8A)
 Operated by: Mobile Area Soaring Corp.

 Greenville Municipal Airport, Greenville, South Carolina
 48th Glider Training Detachment
 Basic/Advanced Glider Training School (TG-8A, CG-4A)
 Operated by: Southern Airways, Inc.

 Grand Forks Airport, Grand Forks, North Dakota
 24th Glider Training Detachment (TG-8A)
 Pre-Glider/Primary Training School
 Operated by: Jolly Flying Service

 Kirkwood Field, Crookston, Minnesota
 33D Glider Training Detachment
 Pre-Glider/Primary Training School (TG-8A)
 Operated by: L. Millar-Wittig

 Lobb Field, Rochester, Minnesota
 32d Glider Training Detachment
 Pre-Glider/Primary Training School (TG-6A)
 Operated by: Fontana School of Aeronautics

 Stillwater Airport, Stillwater, Minnesota
 34th Glider Training Detachment
 Pre-Glider/Primary Training School (TG-6A)
 Operated by: North Aviation Company

 Monticello Field, Monticello, Minnesota
 35th Glider Training Detachment
 Pre-Glider/Primary Training School (TG-6A)
 Operated by: Hinck Flying Service, Inc.

See also

Other Eastern Flying Training Command Flight Training Wings:
 27th Flying Training Wing (World War II) Basic Flight Training
 28th Flying Training Wing (World War II) Advanced Flight Training, Single Engine
 30th Flying Training Wing (World War II) Advanced Flight Training, Two Engine
 74th Flying Training Wing (U.S. Army Air Forces) Classification/Preflight/Specialized/Navigation
 75th Flying Training Wing (U.S. Army Air Forces) Gunnery
 76th Flying Training Wing (U.S. Army Air Forces) Specialized Four-Engine Training

References

Training wings of the United States Army Air Forces
Military units and formations established in 1942
1942 establishments in the United States
Military units and formations disestablished in 1946
1942 establishments in Georgia (U.S. state)
1946 disestablishments in Alabama